Lake Bosworth is a census-designated place (CDP) in Snohomish County, Washington, United States. The population was 667 at the 2010 census.

Geography
Lake Bosworth is located at  (48.045078, -121.968615).

According to the United States Census Bureau, the CDP has a total area of 0.6 square miles (1.7 km2), of which, 0.5 square miles (1.3 km2) of it is land and 0.1 square miles (0.3 km2) of it (20.00%) is water.

Demographics
As of the census of 2000, there were 204 people, 79 households, and 60 families residing in the CDP. The population density was 390.1 people per square mile (151.5/km2). There were 104 housing units at an average density of 198.9/sq mi (77.2/km2). The racial makeup of the CDP was 93.63% White, 0.49% African American, 0.49% Native American, and 5.39% from two or more races. Hispanic or Latino of any race were 2.45% of the population.

There were 79 households, out of which 35.4% had children under the age of 18 living with them, 65.8% were married couples living together, 5.1% had a female householder with no husband present, and 22.8% were non-families. 16.5% of all households were made up of individuals, and 1.3% had someone living alone who was 65 years of age or older. The average household size was 2.58 and the average family size was 2.85.

In the CDP, the age distribution of the population shows 24.5% under the age of 18, 5.9% from 18 to 24, 28.4% from 25 to 44, 31.4% from 45 to 64, and 9.8% who were 65 years of age or older. The median age was 41 years. For every 100 females, there were 100.0 males. For every 100 females age 18 and over, there were 100.0 males.

The median income for a household in the CDP was $57,917, and the median income for a family was $59,333. Males had a median income of $60,156 versus $25,156 for females. The per capita income for the CDP was $23,526. None of the population or families were below the poverty line.

References

Census-designated places in Snohomish County, Washington
Census-designated places in Washington (state)